Giuffria was an American rock band from Washington, D.C., formed in 1981 by Gregg Giuffria after his departure from the band Angel.

History 
Giuffria was formed as Gregg Giuffria's side project in 1981 after his departure from Angel. At the onset, Giuffria had intended to forge this project under the 'Angel' moniker, until several members of the band took suit. The band's classic line-up consisted of Gregg Giuffria on keyboards, David Glen Eisley (lead vocalist), Craig Goldy (guitar), Chuck Wright (bass), and Alan Krigger (drums). Eisley had recently been vocalist for Los Angeles-based band Sorcery. Goldy had briefly been a member of hard rock/glam metal band Rough Cutt, while Wright had guested on 2 tracks on Quiet Riot's album, Metal Health, although not an official member at the time.  Tom Quinton played drums for several months in 1983–84, but was dumped in favor of long time session drummer Alan Krigger, who was deemed to have a better image than Quinton.

Giuffria were signed to MCA Records in 1984. Their debut album Giuffria, soon followed, peaking at No. 26 on the album charts, while spawning two hit singles, "Call to the Heart" (Hot 100 #15) and "Lonely in Love" (Hot 100 #57).

The band was the opening act for Deep Purple on the latter's 1984 reformation US tour. Throughout that tour, despite receiving rave reviews as the opening act, the members of Giuffria were subjected to mistreatment by Deep Purple lead guitarist Ritchie Blackmore, who cut the band's set from 45 minutes to 25. They also were forbidden guitar solos and encores, and also had to play with the arena lights on.

The band toured as opener on Foreigner's "Agent Provocateur" Tour, and enjoyed considerable success. The band played a few shows in Japan in June 1985 and a live video was released as Giuffria Japan Tour '85. Giuffria was also featured on the Gotcha! soundtrack, with "Never Too Late" and "Say It Ain't True." A third track "What's Your Name?" featured Gregg Giuffria and David Glen Eisley, but was listed under the name Camelflage. Gregg also produced several of the album's tracks.

Giuffria's next album, Silk and Steel, was released in 1986, following some lineup changes. Goldy had joined Dio and was replaced by guitarist Lanny Cordola, while Wright returned to Quiet Riot (this time joining the band as an official member) and was replaced by Rick Bozzo and later David Sikes. First single "I Must be Dreaming" failed to hit the Top 40, peaking at No. 52, with the album peaking at No. 60 on the Billboard 200. A second single, "Love You Forever", was released, but label promotion was poor and aside from an American Bandstand performance of the single it quickly disappeared, failing to make the Hot 100.

Giuffria left MCA in 1987 and disbanded shortly after recording demos for a third album, which included the return of bassist Chuck Wright and the debut of drummer Ken Mary, who had replaced Alan Krigger. Some of these demos would eventually appear on the House of Lords debut album, and nine tracks from the Giuffria III sessions were included on David Glen Eisley's Lost Tapes release.

On an episode of That Metal Show in 2010, guitarist Craig Goldy claims there is talk of a reunion of the band.

The media revealed in April 2015 that Giuffria (featuring Eisley, Goldy and Krigger) would be part of the Rockingham lineup at Nottingham's Rock City October 23–25. Giuffria supported headline act Dokken on that Sunday.

2017 saw Eisley and Goldy teaming up to record an album under the name "Eisley/Goldy" titled Blood, Guts and Games, which was released at the end of the year. Original Giuffria bassist Chuck Wright also contributed to the record, while Krigger appears as the drummer in the music video for the album's first single, "The Heart Is a Lonely Hunter."

Members 
Present:
David Glen Eisley – lead vocals, keyboards, harmonica (1983–1987, 2015), guitar (2015)
Craig Goldy – guitars, backing vocals (1983–1985, 2015), bass (2015)
Alan Krigger – drums, percussion (1984–1987, 2015)
Adam Emmons – keyboards (2015)
Past:
Gregg Giuffria – keyboards, synthesizers, keytar, piano, backing vocals (1983–1987)
Tom Quinton – drums, percussion (1983–1984)
Lanny Cordola – guitars (1985–1987)
Rick Bozzo – bass (1985–1986)
David Sikes – bass (1986–1987)
Chuck Wright – bass, backing vocals (1983–1985, 1987)
Ken Mary – drums, percussion (1987)

Discography

Albums 
Giuffria (1984, MCA Records)
Silk + Steel (1986, MCA Records)
Giuffria III (1987, unreleased)

Singles

Other appearances 
Gotcha! OST (1985, MCA Records)

References

Bibliography

External links 
 Discography at MusicMight
 Interview with Drummer Alan Krigger

1982 establishments in Washington, D.C.
American glam metal musical groups
American glam rock musical groups
American hard rock musical groups
Musical groups established in 1982
Musical groups disestablished in 1987
Musical groups reestablished in 2015
Musical groups disestablished in 2015
Rock music groups from Washington, D.C.